Thaddus Dewayn McFadden Sr. (born August 14, 1962) played for the Buffalo Bills during the 1987 NFL season. Previously, he had been a member of the Birmingham Stallions of the United States Football League. He was a wide receiver.

Personal
He is the father of professional basketball player Thad McFadden.

References

Players of American football from Flint, Michigan
Buffalo Bills players
Birmingham Stallions players
Wisconsin Badgers football players
American football wide receivers
1962 births
Living people